Qareh Quch-e Min Bashi (also Romanized as Qareh Qūch-e Mīn Bāshī and Qarah Qūch-e Mīnbāshī; also known as Qarah Qūch-e ‘Olyā, Ghareh Ghooch Manbashi, and Karakhach Ashaghī) is a village in Minjavan-e Gharbi Rural District, Minjavan District, Khoda Afarin County, East Azerbaijan Province, Iran. At the 2006 census, its population was 26, in 5 families.

References 

Populated places in Khoda Afarin County